James Douglas Graham Wood (born 1 November 1965) is an English literary critic, essayist and novelist.

Wood was The Guardians chief literary critic between 1992 and 1995. He was a senior editor at The New Republic between 1995 and 2007. , he is Professor of the Practice of Literary Criticism at Harvard University and a staff writer at The New Yorker magazine.

Early life and education
James Wood was born in Durham, England, to Dennis William Wood (born 1928), a Dagenham-born minister and professor of zoology at Durham University, and Sheila Graham Wood, née Lillia, a schoolteacher from Scotland. 

Wood was raised in Durham in an evangelical wing of the Church of England, an environment he describes as austere and serious. He was educated at Durham Chorister School and Eton College, both on music scholarships. He read English Literature at Jesus College, Cambridge, where in 1988 he graduated with a First.

Career

Writing
After Cambridge, Wood "holed up in London in a vile house in Herne Hill, and started trying to make it as a reviewer". His career began reviewing books for The Guardian. In 1990, he won Young Journalist of the Year at the British Press Awards. From 1991 to 1995 Wood was the chief literary critic of The Guardian, and in 1994 served as a judge for the Booker Prize for fiction. 

In 1995 he became a senior editor at The New Republic in the United States. In 2007 Wood left his role at The New Republic to become a staff writer at The New Yorker. Wood's reviews and essays have appeared frequently in The New York Times, The New Yorker, the New York Review of Books, and the London Review of Books where he is a member of its editorial board. He and his wife, the novelist Claire Messud, are on the editorial board of the literary magazine The Common, based at Amherst College.

Teaching
Wood began teaching literature in a class he co-taught with the late novelist Saul Bellow at Boston University. Wood also taught at Kenyon College in Ohio, and since September 2003 has taught half time at Harvard University, first as a Visiting Lecturer and then as Professor of the Practice of Literary Criticism.

In 2010–11, he was the Weidenfeld Visiting Professor of European Comparative Literature in St Anne's College, Oxford.

Ideas
Like the critic Harold Bloom, Wood advocates an aesthetic approach to literature, rather than more ideologically driven trends that are popular in contemporary academic literary criticism. In an interview with The Harvard Crimson Wood explains that the "novel exists to be affecting...to shake us profoundly. When we're rigorous about feeling, we're honoring that." The reader, then, should approach the text as a writer, "which is [about] making aesthetic judgments."

Wood coined the term hysterical realism, which he uses to denote the contemporary conception of the "big, ambitious novel" that pursues vitality "at all costs." Hysterical realism describes novels that are characterised by chronic length, manic characters, frenzied action, and frequent digressions on topics secondary to the story. In response to an essay Wood wrote on the subject, author Zadie Smith described hysterical realism as a

Wood coined the term commercial realism, which he identifies with the author Graham Greene, and, in particular, with his book The Heart of the Matter. He clarified it as attention to the minutiae of daily life, taking in mind elements of the everyday that are important owing to their supposed lack of importance. He believes it to be an effective style of writing because it captures reality by depicting banal features as well as interesting ones.

Wood emphasises throughout the book How Fiction Works (particularly in the final chapter) that the most important literary style is realism. He states:

Wood additionally attests to the significance of Flaubert in developing the form of the novel:

Others on Wood
In reviewing one of his works Adam Begley of the Financial Times wrote that Wood "is the best literary critic of his generation".

Martin Amis described Wood as "a marvellous critic, one of the few remaining." Fellow book reviewer and journalist Christopher Hitchens was fond of James Wood's work, in one case giving his students a copy of Wood's review of the Updike novel Terrorist, citing it as far better than his own.

In the 2004 issue of n+1 the editors criticised both Wood and The New Republic, writing:  James Wood wrote a reply in the Fall 2005 issue, explaining his conception of the "autonomous novel," in response to which the n+1 editors devoted a large portion of the journal's subsequent issue to a roundtable on the state of contemporary literature and criticism.

Harold Bloom, in a 2008 interview with Vice Magazine, stated: "Oh, don’t even mention [Wood]. He doesn’t exist. He just does not exist at all. A publisher wanted to send me [Wood's] book and I said, 'Please don’t.' [...] I told them, 'Please don’t bother to send it.' I didn’t want to have to throw it out. There’s nothing to the man."

Awards
He was a recipient of the 2010/2011 Berlin Prize Fellowship from the American Academy in Berlin.

Personal life
In 1992 Wood married Claire Messud, an American novelist. They reside in Cambridge, Massachusetts, and have a daughter, Livia, and a son, Lucian.

Selected works

Notes
 Wood has written the following: "I have made a home in the United States, but it is not quite Home. For instance, I have no desire to become an American citizen. Recently, when I arrived at Boston, the immigration officer commented on the length of time I've held a Green Card. 'A Green Card is usually considered a path to citizenship,' he said, a sentiment both irritatingly reproving and movingly patriotic. I mumbled something about how he was perfectly correct, and left it at that. [...] The poet and novelist Patrick McGuinness, in his forthcoming book Other People's Countries (itself a rich analysis of home and homelessness; McGuinness is half-Irish and half-Belgian) quotes Simenon, who was asked why he didn't change his nationality, 'the way successful francophone Belgians often did'. Simenon replied: 'There was no reason for me to be born Belgian, so there’s no reason for me to stop being Belgian.' I wanted to say something similar, less wittily, to the immigration officer: precisely because I don't need to become an American citizen, to take citizenship would seem flippant; leave its benefits for those who need a new land."

References

External links

 James Wood at The Guardian
 James Wood at the London Review of Books
 James Wood at The New Republic
 James Wood at The New Yorker
 Text and video of keynote speech at the 2009 Griffin Poetry Prize ceremony

1965 births
Living people
Alumni of Jesus College, Cambridge
English expatriates in the United States
English people of Scottish descent
Fellows of the Royal Society of Literature
Harvard University faculty
Kenyon College faculty
English essayists
English male novelists
Literary critics of English
English literary critics
The Guardian people
The New Republic people
The New Yorker critics
The New Yorker staff writers
People educated at the Chorister School, Durham
People educated at Eton College
People from Durham, England